Statistical physics is a branch of physics that evolved from a foundation of statistical mechanics, which uses methods of probability theory and statistics, and particularly the mathematical tools for dealing with large populations and approximations, in solving physical problems. It can describe a wide variety of fields with an inherently stochastic nature. Its applications include many problems in the fields of physics, biology, chemistry, and neuroscience. Its main purpose is to clarify the properties of matter in aggregate, in terms of physical laws governing atomic motion.

Statistical mechanics develop the phenomenological results of thermodynamics from a probabilistic examination of the underlying microscopic systems. Historically, one of the first topics in physics where statistical methods were applied was the field of classical mechanics, which is concerned with the motion of particles or objects when subjected to a force.

Scope
Statistical physics explains and quantitatively describes superconductivity, superfluidity, turbulence, collective phenomena in solids and plasma, and the structural features of liquid. It underlies the modern astrophysics. In solid state physics, statistical physics aids the study of liquid crystals, phase transitions, and critical phenomena. Many experimental studies of matter are entirely based on the statistical description of a system. These include the scattering of cold neutrons, X-ray, visible light, and more. Statistical physics also plays a role in materials science, nuclear physics, astrophysics, chemistry, biology and medicine (e.g. study of the spread of infectious diseases).

Statistical mechanics

Statistical mechanics provides a framework for relating the microscopic properties of individual atoms and molecules to the macroscopic or bulk properties of materials that can be observed in everyday life, therefore explaining thermodynamics as a natural result of statistics, classical mechanics, and quantum mechanics at the microscopic level.  Because of this history, statistical physics is often considered synonymous with statistical mechanics or statistical thermodynamics.

 

Furthermore, the probability of a given state, occurring is given by

 

Here we see that very-high-energy states have little probability of occurring, a result that is consistent with intuition.

A statistical approach can work well in classical systems when the number of degrees of freedom (and so the number of variables) is so large that the exact solution is not possible, or not really useful. Statistical mechanics can also describe work in non-linear dynamics, chaos theory, thermal physics, fluid dynamics (particularly at high Knudsen numbers), or plasma physics.

Quantum statistical mechanics
Quantum statistical mechanics is statistical mechanics applied to quantum mechanical systems. In quantum mechanics, a statistical ensemble (probability distribution over possible quantum states) is described by a density operator S, which is a non-negative, self-adjoint, trace-class operator of trace 1 on the Hilbert space H describing the quantum system.  This can be shown under various mathematical formalisms for quantum mechanics.  One such formalism is provided by quantum logic.

Monte Carlo method

Although some problems in statistical physics can be solved analytically using approximations and expansions, most current research utilizes the large processing power of modern computers to simulate or approximate solutions. A common approach to statistical problems is to use a Monte Carlo simulation to yield insight into the properties of a complex system. Monte Carlo methods are important in computational physics, physical chemistry, and related  fields, and have diverse applications including medical physics, where they are used to model radiation transport for radiation dosimetry calculations.

See also

 Combinatorics and physics
 Complex network
 Dynamics of Markovian particles
 Mathematical physics
 Mean sojourn time
 Statistical field theory

Notes

References

Further reading

 
Formal sciences